Awaous macrorhynchus is a species of goby endemic to Madagascar where it is known from brackish and fresh waters.  This species can reach a length of  TL.

References

macrorhynchus
Fish of Madagascar
Fish described in 1867
Taxonomy articles created by Polbot